The 1975 Star World Championships were held on Lake Michigan, United States in 1975.

Results

References

1975 in sailing
Star World Championships in the United States